Baccharis acutata is a species of flowering plant in the family Asteraceae and is an endemic to Cuba.

References

acutata
Endemic flora of Cuba